Patrick Darren Atkinson (born 22 May 1970) is an English former professional footballer.

References

External links

1970 births
Living people
English footballers
Hartlepool United F.C. players
Gateshead F.C. players
Newcastle Blue Star F.C. players
Barrow A.F.C. players
Workington A.F.C. players
York City F.C. players
Scarborough F.C. players
Queen of the South F.C. players
Blyth Spartans A.F.C. players
Durham City A.F.C. players
Newcastle Benfield F.C. players
English Football League players
Scottish Football League players
Association football fullbacks